Sala Parish is a territorial unit of Mārupe Municipality in Latvia . From 2009 until 2021, it was part of Babīte Municipality. Prior to 2009, it was part of Riga District. Sala Parish is defined by Latvian law as a part of the region of Vidzeme.

Villages 
 Spuņciems (parish centre)
 Gātciems
 Kaģi
 Kūdra
 Pavasari
 Pērnciems
 Silmalas
 Sīpolciems
 Straupciems
 Varkaļi

References 

Parishes of Latvia
Mārupe Municipality
Vidzeme